Raam Mori (born 1993) is a Gujarati language short story writer, Screenwriter and columnist from Gujarat, India, primarily known for his short stories depicting the rural life of Saurashtra. Mahotu is an anthology of his short stories, which received Sahitya Akademi's Yuva Puraskar (2017).

Early life 
He was born on 2 February 1993 at Mota Surka, a village in Sihor, Gujarat. His parents were Tejalba and Bhavsangbhai Mori. His family is native to Lakhavad, a village near Palitana. He completed his studies in fabrication engineering.

He started writing short stories at age 17. His stories have been published in Gujarati literary magazines such as Shabdasrishti, Navneet Samarpan, Etad, Tathapi and Shabdasar.

He lives in Ahmedabad.

Career 
He worked with TV9 (Gujarati) and then joined Colors Gujarati. He works with Vijaygiri Filmos. He wrote the weekly column, "Mukam Varta", in Divya Bhaskar, and "The Confession Box", in Mumbai Samachar. He wrote the column Love You Zindagi for Gujarati magazine Cocktail Zindagi and #We, in Phulchhab. He serves as visiting faculty at the National Institute of Mass Communication and Journalism (NIMCJ), Ahmedabad.

In 2016, he published his short story collection Mahotu, which was critically acclaimed by Gujarati writers and critics including Raghuveer Chaudhary and Kirit Doodhat. His short stories are centered around women of rural Saurashtra. His second short story collection, Coffee Stories, came out in December 2018. His third book a collection of letter stories Confession Box, came out in August 2020.
He debuted in Gujarati cinema with Gujarati film "Montu Ni Bittu", directed by Vijaygiri Bava. After Montu Ni Bittu, he wrote two Gujarati films: Mara Pappa Superhero, directed by Darshan Ashwin Trivedi, and 21mu Tiffin, directed by Vijaygiri Bava. Both films were released in 2021.

Filmography

Recognition 
He was invited to the All Indian Young Writers Meet in 2016 by Sahitya Akademi, Delhi. In 2017, he received Yuva Puraskar for Gujarati language for Mahotu. In 2018, the Bharatiya Bhasha Parishad awarded him the Yuva Puraskar. In the same year, he received Nanabhai Jebalia Smriti Sahitya Puraskar (2017). He received third prize in 2016 from Gujarat Sahitya Akademi for his book Mahotu.

References

External links
 

1993 births
Living people
People from Bhavnagar district
Gujarati-language writers
Indian male short story writers
Indian columnists
21st-century Indian short story writers
21st-century Indian male writers
Recipients of the Sahitya Akademi Yuva Puraskar